The 1898 All-Ireland Senior Football Championship was the 12th staging of Ireland's premier Gaelic football knock-out competition. Dublin were the winners.

Results

Leinster

Dublin were awarded the game.

Munster

All-Ireland final

Championship statistics

Miscellaneous

 Waterford won their only ever Munster final.
 Waterford were represented by Erin's Hope with a few representatives from Lismore Blackwater Ramblers. 
 Limerick and Clare were thrown out because they refused to play their tie at Tipperary.
 It was Dublin's second two in a row as All Ireland champions.

References

All-Ireland Senior Football Championship